List of The Office episodes may refer to:

List of The Office (British TV series) episodes
List of The Office (American TV series) episodes